The Roman Catholic Territorial Prelature of Deán Funes is in Argentina and is a suffragan see of the Archdiocese of Córdoba.

History
On 25 January 1980, Blessed John Paul II established the Territorial Prelature of Deán Funes from the Diocese of Cruz del Eje.

Bishops

Ordinaries
Ramón Iribarne Arámburu, O. de M. † (1980)
Lucas Luis Dónnelly, O. de M. † (1980–2000)
Aurelio José Kühn Hergenreder, O.F.M. (2000– )
Gustavo Gabriel Zurbriggen (2013-)

Coadjutor
Gustavo Gabriel Zurbriggen (2011-2013)

References

Roman Catholic dioceses in Argentina
Roman Catholic Ecclesiastical Province of Córdoba
Territorial prelatures
Christian organizations established in 1980
Roman Catholic dioceses and prelatures established in the 20th century